Erik Thommy (born 20 August 1994) is a German professional footballer who plays as a midfielder and winger for Major League Soccer club Sporting Kansas City.

Club career

FC Augsburg
Thommy joined FC Augsburg in 2010 from TSG Thannhausen and SSV Ulm 1846. At 16 February 2014, he made his Bundesliga debut in a 0–1 home defeat against 1. FC Nürnberg. He appeared as an 82nd-minute substitute.

Kaiserslautern (loan)
In January 2015, Thommy was loaned to 2. Bundesliga club 1. FC Kaiserslautern for a year and a half until summer 2016. However, at the occasion of announcing his loan, FC Augsburg's general manager Stefan Reuter stated that Thommy still was a component of their future plans. Thommy was contracted with Augsburg until 2018. The loan was ended on 31 January 2016.

Jahn Regensburg (loan)
In the 2016 summer transfer window, he was loaned out again, this time to SSV Jahn Regensburg. He made his league debut and first start for Regensburg on 30 July 2016 in a 2–0 home victory over F.C. Hansa Rostock. He was subbed off in the 82nd minute, being replaced by Uwe Hesse.

Stuttgart
On 18 January 2018, Thommy moved to VfB Stuttgart. His debut and first competitive start for Stuttgart came on 3 February 2018 in a 1–1 away draw against VfL Wolfsburg. He scored his first Bundesliga goal on 24 February 2018 against Eintracht Frankfurt. On 19 August 2018, Thommy extended his contract with VfB Stuttgart until June 2022.

On 28 May 2022, Stuttgart announced that they would not extend Thommy's contract beyond the 2021-22 Bundesliga season.

Düsseldorf (loan)
On 10 July 2019, Fortuna Düsseldorf announced the signing of Thommy on loan until the end of 2019–20 season with an option to buy him permanently.

Sporting Kansas City

On 23 June 2022, it was announced that Thommy had signed with Major League Soccer side Sporting Kansas City on a deal until the end of the 2024 season. Thommy debuted for Kansas City on 23 July 2022, starting in a 0-2 loss to Los Angeles FC.

Career statistics

References

External links
 

1994 births
Living people
Sportspeople from Ulm
German footballers
Association football midfielders
Bundesliga players
2. Bundesliga players
3. Liga players
Regionalliga players
FC Augsburg players
FC Augsburg II players
1. FC Kaiserslautern players
1. FC Kaiserslautern II players
SSV Jahn Regensburg players
Fortuna Düsseldorf players
VfB Stuttgart players
VfB Stuttgart II players
Footballers from Baden-Württemberg
Sporting Kansas City players
German expatriate sportspeople in the United States
Expatriate soccer players in the United States
Major League Soccer players